Munzinger is a surname. Notable people with the surname include:

 Ernst Munzinger (1887–1945), German businessman, army officer and National Socialist
 Josef Munzinger (1791–1855), Member of the Swiss Federal Council
 Louis Munzinger (born 1851), New York politician
 Ludwig Munzinger (1877–1957), German encyclopaedist
 Oskar Munzinger (1849–1932), Swiss politician
 Werner Munzinger (1832–1875), Swiss adventurer

See also

 Munzinger-Archiv, German publishing house